Jawan Singh (2 July 1821 – 30 August 1838), was the Maharana (r. 1828–1838) of Princely state of Udaipur. He was a son of Maharana Bhim Singh. He was also a poet under the name of Brijraj. He adopted his third cousin Sardar Singh who was the great grandson of Sangram Singh II through Nath Singh of Bagore.

References

Mewar dynasty
1821 births
1838 deaths